Memorial Hall, or Soldiers and Sailors Memorial Building, is a multi-purpose auditorium located in Kansas City, Kansas. The 3,500-seat auditorium, which has a permanent stage, is used for public assemblies, concerts and sporting events. It was listed on the National Register of Historic Places in 1985. It was designed by architects Rose & Peterson in Georgian style.

Establishment
This venue was built in 1923 then opened in 1925 as a combination civic auditorium and war memorial for World War I veterans.

Events
Many iconic rock bands in the 1960s and 1970s played here. During its September 11, 1972 concert at Memorial Hall, Pink Floyd performed its first Kansas City metro concert and new concept album, The Dark Side of the Moon, five months before the record-setting album's release. REO Speedwagon recorded parts of their first live album, 1977's Live: You Get What You Play For, including the album's closing track, "Golden Country," at the venue on October 31, 1976. Side 4 of Peter Gabriel's 1983 double-LP, Plays Live, including the songs "Shock the Monkey", "Humdrum", "On the Air", and "Biko", was recorded at Memorial Hall on December 4, 1982.

Memorial hall is home to the 15 year WFTDA sanctioned Kansas City Roller Warriors various roller derby teams. KCRW often hosts out of town and international roller derby teams from around the country and globe. The league is made up of 100+ volunteers consisting of KC metro and surrounding residents that volunteer their time, effort and passion to making KCRW a successful organization.
Memorial Hall hosted some games of the Kansas City Steers of the American Basketball League from 1961 to 1963.

Professional wrestling was a Thursday-night tradition at the venue in the 1970s, with cards often taped for the All-Star Wrestling telecast days later.

The Kansas City, Kansas Public Schools district holds an annual convocation for staff at the venue each August. All district staff are present for this event.

See also

 1925 in architecture

References

National Register of Historic Places in Wyandotte County, Kansas
Georgian architecture in Kansas
Buildings and structures in Kansas City, Kansas
Landmarks in Kansas
Music venues completed in 1925
Music venues in Kansas
Sports venues completed in 1925
Sports venues in Kansas
Tourist attractions in Wyandotte County, Kansas
Soldiers and Sailors Memorial Hall, Kansas City
1925 establishments in Kansas